Dexter Blows Hot and Cool is a 1955 album by jazz musician Dexter Gordon.

Reception
The Billboard Reviewer noted that Gordon appeared "somewhat mellowed, making little attempt to impress either as a technician or melodic innovator" but that there was "a quiet authority in his forthright, simply tailored style". Pianist Carl Perkins was lauded as "a newcomer loaded with talent and far-out ideas".

Track listing
"Silver Plated" (Gordon) 
"Cry Me a River" (Hamilton)
"Rhythm Mad" (Gordon)
"Don't Worry About Me" (Bloom, Koehler)
"I Hear Music" (Lane, Losser)
"Bonna Rue" (Gordon)
"I Should Care" (Cahn, Stordahl, Weston)
"Blowin' For Dootsie" (Gordon)
"Tenderly" (Gross, Lawrence)

Personnel
Dexter Gordon — Tenor saxophone
Jimmy Robinson — Trumpet
Carl Perkins — Piano
Leroy Vinnegar — Bass
Chuck Thompson — Drums
Recorded on November 11 and 12, 1955

References

1955 albums
Dexter Gordon albums